The 10th Hong Kong Awards ceremony, honored the best films of 1990 and took place on 21 April 1991 at Hong Kong Academy for Performing Arts, Wan Chai, Hong Kong. The ceremony was hosted by Anita Mui and Philip Chan, during the ceremony awards are presented in 15 categories.

Awards
Winners are listed first, highlighted in boldface, and indicated with a double dagger.

References

External links
Official website of the Hong Kong Film Awards

1991
1990 film awards
1991 in Hong Kong